Michael Cochrane is an English actor.

Biography

Early life
Cochrane was born in Brighton, East Sussex. He was educated at Cranleigh School.

Career
Cochrane has played many television and radio roles including Oliver Sterling in the Radio 4 soap opera The Archers. Another notable television role was as Lieutenant Charles Gaylion, a Royal Flying Corps pilot in the BBC television series Wings (1977–78).

He has twice appeared in the BBC science fiction series Doctor Who, first as Charles Cranleigh in the serial Black Orchid (1982) and later as Redvers Fenn-Cooper in Ghost Light (1989). Cochrane was later associated with Doctor Who when he appeared in the 2006 Big Finish Productions audio drama, No Man's Land. This was followed by further appearances in the 2008 Big Finish Productions audio drama Brotherhood of the Daleks, Trail of the White Worm/The Oseidon Adventure in 2012, and The Fate of Krelos/Return to Telos in 2015. 

Cochrane has also appeared as different characters in the Yorkshire Television period drama Heartbeat. His first appearance was as the narcissistic businessman Derek Lightfoot in the episode Fool for Love (1997). A further appearance came in 2009, when Cochrane appeared as a character named Cunningham, a confidence trickster and sneak thief in two episodes; ("Thursday's Children" and "The Middle of Somewhere") both of which were set in Australia.

Other significant roles in which Cochrane has appeared are The Pallisers (1974),  Love in a Cold Climate (1980), The Citadel (1983), a BBC serial adaptation of Goodbye Mr. Chips (1984), Raffles (1985–1993), No Job for a Lady, The Chief (1990–1995), and as Sir Henry Simmerson in the Sharpe series. His film career has included roles in Escape to Victory (1981), The Return of the Soldier (1982), Real Life (1984), Number One Gun (1990), The Saint (1997), Incognito (1998), A Different Loyalty (2004) and The Iron Lady (2011).

He was featured in the ITV science fiction series The Uninvited. In 2008, he appeared in the soap opera Doctors as Daniel's solicitor and in 2009 in Margaret as MP Alan Clark.

He appeared in the sitcom Perfect World as the sex-obsessed marketing director. He appeared in Offending Angels (2002). He was seen as the vicar in Downton Abbey with Hugh Bonneville and Maggie Smith as well as Johnny Darby in the one-off special Panto! written by John Bishop and Jonathan Harvey. 

He had a small role in episode 5 of the BBC serial drama The Musketeers (2014). He appeared as the ship's officer in the BBC's Keeping Up Appearances episode titled "Sea Fever" (1993) and he also appeared as Mr Price in the ITV's detective drama Wycliffe episode titled "Strangers" (1997). 

In 2016, he played the role of Henry Marten in the Netflix series The Crown. In 2019 Cochrane appeared as one of the Number 2's in the 2016 Big Finish Productions audio drama adaptation of the cult 1960s British TV series The Prisoner aired by BBC Radio 4 Extra.

Personal life
Cochrane is married to the actress Belinda Carroll.

Filmography

Radio

Video games

References

External links

Living people
People educated at Cranleigh School
20th-century English male actors
21st-century English male actors
English male radio actors
English male television actors
Male actors from Brighton
Year of birth missing (living people)